Fred, Freddie or Frederick Sears may refer to:

Frederick W. Sears (1859–1934), American neurologist and academic
Frederick Sears (priest) (1871–1955), English Archdeacon of Cheltenham
Fred F. Sears (1913–1957), American film director
Freddie Sears (born 1989), English footballer